Joe Cool's Dodgem School is a dodgem ride for kids and is themed to the Cedar Fair kids area which is Planet Snoopy. It is located at three parks:
 Joe Cool's Dodgem School at Kings Island
 Joe Cool's Dodgem School at Canada's Wonderland
 Joe Cool's Dodgem School at Cedar Point